Graham Johnson (born 1 May 1958) is a former English cricketer.  Johnson was a left-handed batsman who bowled right-arm fast-medium.  He was born in Hetton-le-Hole, County Durham.

Johnson made his debut for Durham against Cheshire in the 1982 Minor Counties Championship.  He played Minor counties cricket for Durham from 1982 to 1987, making 18 Minor Counties Championship appearances and 7 MCCA Knockout Trophy appearances.  He made his List A debut against Northamptonshire in the 1984 NatWest Trophy.  He made 4 further List A appearances, the last of which came against Middlesex in the 1987 NatWest Trophy.  In his 5 List A matches, he scored 34 runs at an average of 17.00, with a high score of 20 not out.  With the ball, he took 4 wickets at a bowling average of 46.50, with best figures of 2/35.

References

External links
Graham Johnson at ESPNcricinfo
Graham Johnson at CricketArchive

1958 births
Living people
People from Hetton-le-Hole
Cricketers from Tyne and Wear
English cricketers
Durham cricketers